The Valley News (and Sunday Valley News) is a seven-day morning daily newspaper based in Lebanon, New Hampshire, covering the Upper Valley region of New Hampshire and Vermont, in the United States.

Although the newspaper's offices are in Lebanon, its mailing address is a post office box in nearby White River Junction, Vermont. The newspaper covers communities on both sides of the Connecticut River, which forms the state line. The paper's circulation is 16,522. The current editor is Matt Clary.

The paper was founded in 1952 by Allan Churchill Butler. Shortly thereafter he sold the paper to James D. Ewing and Walter Paine.  Paine would serve as editor and publisher of the paper for twenty-four years. In 2012, the Valley News, the Nashua Telegraph, and PolitiFact established "PolitiFact '12 NH," a fact-checking effort focused on the candidates in the 2012 United States presidential election. At the time, Jeffrey Good was the Valley News''' editor. 

Newspapers of New England, a private company based in Concord, New Hampshire, bought the Valley News in 1981 and has owned it since.

 Editorial positions 
The Valley News'' has editorialized in support of same-sex marriage.

References

External links
VNews.com -- Valley News Website

Newspapers published in New Hampshire
Newspapers established in 1952
Grafton County, New Hampshire
Lebanon, New Hampshire
1952 establishments in New Hampshire